Summer Love is a 2019 Nepalese romance drama film, based on Subin Bhattarai's novel Summer Love (2012). The film is directed by Muskan Dhakal, produced by Khagendra Shrestha, Indu Bhandari, written by Subin Bhattarai. The film stars Ashish Piya and Rewati Chetri in the lead roles alongside Suraj Singh Thakuri and Namrata Sapkota.

The film was released on 8 February 2019.

Plot 
Film is based on Subin Bhattarai's Summer Love.

Cast 

 Ashish Piya as Aatit
 Rewati Chetri as Saya
 Suraj Singh Thakuri
 Namrata Sapkota

Awards

References 

Nepalese romantic drama films
Films based on Nepalese novels